Josef Fröwis (born 17 March 1937) is an Austrian former sport shooter who competed in the 1960 Summer Olympics.

References

1937 births
Living people
Austrian male sport shooters
ISSF rifle shooters
Olympic shooters of Austria
Shooters at the 1960 Summer Olympics
People from Feldkirch, Vorarlberg
Sportspeople from Vorarlberg
20th-century Austrian people